North Carolina Highway 5 (NC 5) is a primary state highway in the U.S. state of North Carolina. It runs entirely in Moore County and connects the Sandhills municipalities of Aberdeen and Pinehurst. It also serves as an alternate route for NC 211. NC 5's route was designated in 1961 and it has not changed since then.

Route description
NC 5 starts at a three-way intersection at Malcolm Blue Farm and progresses through downtown Aberdeen, where it crosses US 1/US 15/US 501/NC 211/Sandhills Boulevard and continues northwest towards Pinehurst. It comes to its northern terminus at NC 211 at the Pinehurst/Taylortown city limits border.

All the NC 5 shields east of Sandhills Boulevard have no directional plates; this is because at NC 5's southern terminus, the route is heading in a northerly direction.

NC 5's central segment parallels a railroad owned by Norfolk Southern. Sand Pit Road between Aberdeen and Pinehurst splits from NC 5 and heads due south to the nearby town of Pinebluff.

Nearby points of interest
Pinehurst Harness Track, a horse racing track in Pinehurst
The Pit Golf Links, a nationally popular golf course near Aberdeen
Pinehurst Resort

Major intersections

See also
North Carolina Highway 2, a similar route in the Sandhills region

References

External links

State Ends - NC 5 Termini

005
Transportation in Moore County, North Carolina